Edyta Jasińska (born 28 November 1986) is a track cyclist from  Poland. She represented her nation at the 2009, 2010, 2011, 2014 and 2015 UCI Track Cycling World Championships.

Career results

2008
International Track Challenge Vienna 
2nd Individual Pursuit
2nd Points Race
2009
3rd Individual Pursuit, International Track Challenge Vienna 
2013
Grand Prix Vienna
2nd Individual Pursuit
2nd Points Race
2014
3rd Points Race, Grand Prix Galichyna
2015
1st Points Race, Panevėžys
2nd Points Race, Grand Prix Minsk
Grand Prix Galichyna
2nd Points Race
3rd Scratch Race
3rd Omnium, GP Prostějov – Memorial of Otmar Malecek
2016
Grand Prix of Poland
1st Team Pursuit (with Katarzyna Pawłowska, Natalia Rutkowska and Małgorzata Wojtyra)
2nd Scratch Race
Grand Prix Minsk
1st Points Race
3rd Omnium 
3rd Scratch Race
Grand Prix Galichyna
1st Individual Pursuit
3rd Scratch Race
3rd Omnium
3rd 500m Time Trial
GP Czech Cycling Federation
2nd Points Race
3rd Scratch Race

References

External links
 profile at Cyclingarchives.com

1986 births
Polish female cyclists
Living people
People from Lubań
Olympic cyclists of Poland
Cyclists at the 2016 Summer Olympics
Sportspeople from Lower Silesian Voivodeship
21st-century Polish women